Hamil Grimes (born 15 October 1956) is a Barbadian sprinter. He competed in the men's 400 metres at the 1976 Summer Olympics.

References

1956 births
Living people
Athletes (track and field) at the 1976 Summer Olympics
Athletes (track and field) at the 1984 Summer Olympics
Barbadian male sprinters
Olympic athletes of Barbados
Athletes (track and field) at the 1982 Commonwealth Games
Commonwealth Games competitors for Barbados
Place of birth missing (living people)